Presse quotidienne nationale française is a group of eighteen paid-for French daily newspapers, of which six have circulations in excess of , and four free newspapers, which have a much larger circulation: not only is the paid-for press more expensive, but there are fewer outlets from which to buy newspapers. In recent years many newsstands and newsagents in Paris that sold newspapers have closed, and customers would need to travel far to get some titles.

Paid-for

Free 
Free newspapers are distributed from newsstands and traditional newsagent's shops at the entrances of metro stations and other public places.

Morning 
 20 minutes: Schibsted, a Norwegian group, launched this in France at the start of 2002. With 2,160 million readers, 20 Minutes is the largest general-readership newspaper in France.
 Direct Matin: Published by a partnership of Bolloré and Le Monde. It produces its own content, and also republishes articles from Le Monde and Courrier international.

Evening 
 Direct Soir: Published by Bolloré between 2006 and 2010. The group also publish the morning free newspaperMatinPlus in partnership with the press group La Vie-Le Monde.

21st century
Les Échos Bought by LVMH in the fourth quarter of 2007.
 Le Monde Management struggles in 2007 and 2008. Groupe Le Monde was replaced in 2010 by financiers Xavier Niel, Pierre Bergé and Matthieu Pigasse.
 Le Figaro: Socpresse, publishers of Le Figaro, sold this in 2004 to Serge Dassault.
 Libération: Édouard de Rothschild pushed money into the title in 2005 when it found itself in financial difficulty. In 2006, Serge July (one of the founders of Libération with Jean-Paul Sartre), managing editor, was forced to resign. He was replaced by Laurent Joffrin, late of Libération and previous director of production at Le Nouvel Observateur, a magazine that was relaunched in March 2011. He was himself replaced by Nicolas Demorand. Businessman Bruno Ledoux became the second-largest shareholder in 2011. A rescue plan was launched in 2014 by Ledoux and Patrick Drahi, parting company with Rothschild; Joffrin resumed the leadership.
 France-Soir : Bought by Egyptian businessman Raymond Lakah. After another financial crisis, on 12 April 2006, it was relaunched by journalist Olivier Rey and businessman Jean-Pierre Brunois. It was re-relaunched in 2009 by Alexander Pougatchev, who closed it down in 2012.
 La Tribune was relaunched by Alain Weill in 2007, who sold 80% to the managing director Valérie Decamp. In 2012 the newspaper later sacked him and changed from a daily to weekly format.
 In May 2013, the weekday liberal-leaning L'Opinion was launched by Nicolas Beytout.

The storm of new free titles, together with the expansion of Internet use and the closure of so many points of sale, a turndown in advertising revenue after the World financial crisis of 2007, the
L'irruption des gratuits, l'expansion d'Internet, la fermeture de nombreux points de vente, la baisse des revenus publicitaires à la suite de la crise économique de la fin des années 2000, the high cost of printing and other phenomena significantly affected the print media, especially dailies, which underwent a severe crisis.

See also 
 French newspapers
 Online newspaper
 Presse quotidienne régionale française, the equivalent organisation for the regional press

References 

Daily newspapers published in France
Lists of newspapers
Lists of mass media in France